Caroline Caird Woerner is the Assembly member for the 113th District of the New York State Assembly. She is a Democrat. The district includes portions of Saratoga and Washington Counties.

Life and career
A graduate of Carnegie-Mellon University and Santa Clara University, Woerner had a thirty year career in software development before entering politics. She founded MeetMax Conference Software, located in Saratoga Springs.

Woerner served as a Round Lake Village Trustee from 2008 to 2012, and was a member of the Town of Malta Planning Board from 2008 to 2014. She has been active in historic preservation efforts throughout Saratoga Springs and the surrounding area.

New York Assembly
In 2012, Woerner first ran for the Assembly, but lost to incumbent Tony Jordan by a 53% to 47% margin. In 2014, Jordan was not a candidate for re-election after winning election as Washington County District Attorney in 2013. Woerner however, decided to run again and this time prevailed over Republican Steve Stallmer by a 52% to 48% margin.

She was seated on January 1, 2015.  Woerner is serving as the Chair of the Subcommittee on Agricultural Production & Technology.

References

External links
New York State Assemblywoman Carrie Woerner official site

Living people
Democratic Party members of the New York State Assembly
Place of birth missing (living people)
Santa Clara University alumni
Carnegie Mellon University alumni
21st-century American politicians
21st-century American women politicians
Women state legislators in New York (state)
1962 births